Gerardo Tazzer Valencia (born 12 December 1951, in Mexico City) is a Mexican equestrian and Olympic medalist.

References

1951 births
Living people
Mexican male equestrians
Olympic equestrians of Mexico
Olympic bronze medalists for Mexico
Equestrians at the 1980 Summer Olympics
Equestrians at the 1984 Summer Olympics
Equestrians at the 1988 Summer Olympics
Equestrians at the 2004 Summer Olympics
Olympic medalists in equestrian
Sportspeople from Mexico City
Medalists at the 1980 Summer Olympics
Pan American Games medalists in equestrian
Pan American Games silver medalists for Mexico
Pan American Games bronze medalists for Mexico
Equestrians at the 1979 Pan American Games
Equestrians at the 1983 Pan American Games
Equestrians at the 1987 Pan American Games
Medalists at the 1979 Pan American Games
Medalists at the 1983 Pan American Games
Medalists at the 1987 Pan American Games